Isogenoides frontalis, the Hudsonian springfly, is a species of springfly in the family Perlodidae. It is found in North America.

References

Perlodidae
Articles created by Qbugbot
Insects described in 1838